Myoviridae is a family of bacteriophages in the order Caudovirales. Bacteria and archaea serve as natural hosts. There are 625 species in this family, assigned to eight subfamilies and 217 genera.

Subdivisions
The subfamily Tevenvirinae (synonym: Tequatrovirinae) is named after its type species Enterobacteria phage T4. Members of this subfamily are morphologically indistinguishable and have moderately elongated heads of about 110 nanometers (nm) in length, 114 nm long tails with a collar, base plates with short spikes and six long kinked tail fibers. The genera within this subfamily are divided on the basis of head morphology with the genus Tequatrovirus (Provisional name: T4virus) having a head length of 137 nm and those in the genus Schizot4virus being 111 nm in length. Within the genera on the basis of protein homology the species have been divided into a number of groups.

The subfamily Peduovirinae have virions with heads of 60 nm in diameter and tails of 135 × 18 nm. These phages are easily identified because contracted sheaths tend to slide off the tail core. The P" phage is the type species.

The subfamily Spounavirinae are all virulent, broad-host range phages that infect members of the Bacillota. They possess isometric heads of 87-94 nm in diameter and conspicuous capsomers, striated 140-219 nm long tails and a double base plate. At the tail tip are globular structures now known to be the base plate spikes and short kinked tail fibers with six-fold symmetry. Members of this group usually possess large (127–142 kb) nonpermuted genomes with 3.1–20 kb terminal redundancies. The name for this subfamily is derived from SPO plus una (Latin for one).

The haloviruses HF1 and HF2 belong to the same genus but since they infect archaea rather than bacteria are likely to be placed in a separate genus once their classification has been settled.

A dwarf group has been proposed on morphological and genomic grounds. This group includes the phages Aeromonas salmonicida phage 56, Vibrio cholerae phages 138 and CP-T1, Bdellovibrio phage φ1422 and Pectobacterium carotovorum phage ZF40. Their shared characteristics include an identical virion morphology, characterized by usually short contractile tails and all have genome sizes of approximately 45 kilobases. The gene order in the structural unit of the genome is in the order: terminase—portal—head—tail—base plate—tail fibers.

Virology

Viruses in Myoviridae are non-enveloped, with head-tail (with a neck) geometries. Genomes are linear, double-stranded DNA, around 33-244kb in length. The genome codes for 40 to 415 proteins. It has terminally redundant sequences. The GC-content is ~35%. The genome encodes 200-300 proteins that are transcribed in operons. 5-Hydroxymethylcytosine may be present in the genome (instead of thymidine).

The tubular tail has helical symmetry and is 16-20 nm in diameter. It consists of a central tube, a contractile sheath, a collar, a base plate, six tail pins and six long fibers. It is similar to Tectiviridae, but differs in the fact that a myovirus' tail is permanent.

Contractions of the tail require ATP. On contraction of the sheath, sheath subunits slide over each other and the tail shortens to 10–15 nm in length.

Life cycle

On attaching to a host cell, the virus uses its contractile sheath like a syringe, piercing the cell wall with its central tube and injecting the genetic material into the host. The injected DNA takes over the host cell's mechanisms for transcription and translation and begins to manufacture new viruses. Replication follows the replicative transposition model. DNA-templated transcription is the method of transcription. Translation takes place by -1 ribosomal frameshifting. The virus exits the host cell by lysis, and holin/endolysin/spanin proteins.
Bacteria and archaea serve as the natural host. Transmission route is passive diffusion.

Although Myoviruses are in general lytic, lacking the genes required to become lysogenic, a number of temperate species are known.

Applications
Because most Myoviridae are lytic, rather than temperate, phages, some researchers have investigated their use as a therapy for bacterial diseases in humans and other animals.

Taxonomy
The following eight subfamilies are recognized:
Emmerichvirinae
Eucampyvirinae
Gorgonvirinae
Ounavirinae
Peduovirinae
Tevenvirinae
Twarogvirinae
Vequintavirinae

Additionally, the following genera are unassigned to a subfamily:

Abouovirus
Acionnavirus
Agricanvirus
Ahtivirus
Alcyoneusvirus
Alexandravirus
Anamdongvirus
Anaposvirus
Aokuangvirus
Asteriusvirus
Atlauavirus
Aurunvirus
Ayohtrevirus
Baikalvirus
Bakolyvirus
Barbavirus
Bcepfunavirus
Bcepmuvirus
Becedseptimavirus
Bellamyvirus
Bendigovirus
Biquartavirus
Bixzunavirus
Borockvirus
Brigitvirus
Brizovirus
Brunovirus
Busanvirus
Carpasinavirus
Chakrabartyvirus
Charybdisvirus
Chiangmaivirus
Colneyvirus
Cymopoleiavirus
Derbicusvirus
Dibbivirus
Donellivirus
Elmenteitavirus
Elvirus
Emdodecavirus
Eneladusvirus
Eponavirus
Erskinevirus
Eurybiavirus
Ficleduovirus
Flaumdravirus
Fukuivirus
Gofduovirus
Goslarvirus
Haloferacalesvirus
Hapunavirus
Heilongjiangvirus
Iapetusvirus
Iodovirus
Ionavirus
Jedunavirus
Jilinvirus
Jimmervirus
Kanagawavirus
Kanaloavirus
Klausavirus
Kleczkowskavirus
Kungbxnavirus
Kylevirus
Lagaffevirus
Leucotheavirus
Libanvirus
Lietduovirus
Llyrvirus
Loughboroughvirus
Lubbockvirus
Machinavirus
Marfavirus
Marthavirus
Mazuvirus
Menderavirus
Metrivirus
Mieseafarmvirus
Mimasvirus
Moabitevirus
Moturavirus
Muldoonvirus
Mushuvirus
Muvirus
Myoalterovirus
Myohalovirus
Myosmarvirus
Naesvirus
Namakavirus
Nankokuvirus
Neptunevirus
Nereusvirus
Nerrivikvirus
Nodensvirus
Noxifervirus
Nylescharonvirus
Obolenskvirus
Otagovirus
Pakpunavirus
Palaemonvirus
Pbunavirus
Peatvirus
Pemunavirus
Petsuvirus
Phabquatrovirus
Phapecoctavirus
Phikzvirus
Pippivirus
Plaisancevirus
Plateaulakevirus
Polybotosvirus
Pontusvirus
Popoffvirus
Punavirus
Qingdaovirus
Rahariannevirus
Radnorvirus
Ripduovirus
Risingsunvirus
Ronodorvirus
Rosemountvirus
Saclayvirus
Saintgironsvirus
Salacisavirus
Salmondvirus
Sarumanvirus
Sasquatchvirus
Schmittlotzvirus
Seoulvirus
Shandongvirus
Sherbrookevirus
Shirahamavirus
Shalavirus
Svunavirus
Tabernariusvirus
Takahashivirus
Tamkungvirus
Taranisvirus
Tefnutvirus
Tegunavirus
Thaumasvirus
Thetisvirus
Thornevirus
Tijeunavirus
Toutatisvirus
Tulanevirus
Vellamovirus
Vhmlvirus
Vibakivirus
Wellingtonvirus
Wifcevirus
Winklervirus
Yokohamavirus
Yoloswagvirus
Yongloolinvirus

References

External links

 Viralzone: Myoviridae
 ICTV
 Complete Genomes of Myoviridae

 
Virus families